An éminence grise or grey eminence is a powerful decision-maker or adviser who operates "behind the scenes", or in a non-public or unofficial capacity.

This phrase originally referred to François Leclerc du Tremblay, the right-hand man of Cardinal Richelieu.  Leclerc was a Capuchin friar who was renowned for his beige robe attire, as beige was termed "grey" in that era. The style His Eminence is used to address or refer to a cardinal in the Roman Catholic Church. Although Leclerc never achieved the rank of cardinal, those around him addressed him as such in deference to the considerable influence this "grey" friar held over "His Eminence the Cardinal". As a result, the term grey cardinal has also been used.

Leclerc is referred to in several popular works. Aldous Huxley wrote an English biography of Leclerc entitled Grey Eminence. There is also an 1873 painting by Jean-Léon Gérôme, L'Éminence Grise, which depicts him descending the grand staircase of the Palais Cardinal and the deference shown to him by others present. Leclerc is referred to in Alexandre Dumas' The Three Musketeers as the character Father Joseph, a powerful associate of Richelieu and one to be feared.

Historical examples 
 Empress Jia Nanfeng and Empress Dowager Cixi are two examples of women who essentially ruled Imperial Chinese dynasties. As women were barred from reigning in their own right, the history of China is replete with cases of women exercising political power through their male relatives.
 The Italian Christian Democratic leader Giulio Andreotti was often seen as the éminence grise of governments even when he was not actually Prime Minister.
Vice President of the United States Dick Cheney was described as an éminence grise of the George W. Bush administration, "a powerful but uncompromising politician with the ear of the president" regarding matters of national security and foreign policy.
 American diplomat and policy maker Dennis Ross was "viewed as the éminence grise, a sort of Rasputin who casts a spell over secretaries of state and presidents", according to Middle East experts who worked with him during the  administrations of Ronald Reagan, George H.W. Bush, Bill Clinton, George W. Bush, and Barack Obama.
 John Dee is sometimes considered an éminence grise. Officially, he was the court astrologer to Elizabeth I, but exercised more power as an overall advisor to the Queen.
Joseph Stalin was frequently called an éminence grise by Leon Trotsky, whom he defeated in the succession struggles for Soviet leadership following Lenin's death in 1924.
Adolf Hitler's private secretary Martin Bormann was nicknamed the Brown Eminence.
Mikhail Suslov acted as an éminence grise behind General Secretary Leonid Brezhnev. A political hardliner aptly nicknamed the Grey Cardinal of the Kremlin, he was the Second Secretary of the Communist Party of the Soviet Union but also played the role of unofficial Chief-Ideologue of the CPSU and one of the key decision makers during not only the Brezhnev, but also the Khrushchev and Stalin eras. Other observers however have given the title of éminence grise during the Brezhnev era variously to Yuri Andropov, Dmitry Ustinov, Andrei Gromyko and Konstantin Chernenko.
Marcia Williams, private secretary and later Political Secretary to British Prime Minister Harold Wilson, was described as his éminence grise.
Choi Soon-sil was revealed by corruption investigations during the 2016 South Korean political scandal to have had previously hidden political influence over the 11th President of South Korea, Park Geun-hye. She was perceived to be responsible for masterminding governmental policy and decision-making during Park's administration.
 William de la Pole to Henry VI of England.
Jean Monnet has been described as an éminence grise given his key role in drafting the Schuman Declaration.
Joker Arroyo emerged as an éminence grise to Corazon Aquino after the 1986 People Power Revolution that toppled dictator Ferdinand Marcos.

Contemporary examples 
Wang Huning is often considered the éminence grise of three paramount leaders of China: Jiang Zemin, Hu Jintao, and Xi Jinping. 
Vladislav Surkov is often regarded by observers to be the éminence grise of Vladimir Putin. 
Jarosław Kaczyński is often regarded as the real leader of Poland via his position as leader of the ruling party, twice choosing who should be the Prime Minister of Poland contrary to precedence where said role is taken by the leader of the ruling party, currently himself. Despite no official role in government he often meets foreign leaders in a representative capacity, such as Angela Merkel, Donald Trump and Volodymyr Zelenskyy.

See also

 Camarilla
 Power behind the throne
 Kingmaker
 Svengali

References

Deep politics
French words and phrases
Political metaphors referring to people